Simen Auseth (born 8 April 1963) is a Norwegian boxer. He was born in Oslo. He competed at the 1984 Summer Olympics in Los Angeles. He represented the club IF Ørnulf.

References

External links 
 

1963 births
Living people
Sportspeople from Oslo
Olympic boxers of Norway
Boxers at the 1984 Summer Olympics
Norwegian male boxers
Light-middleweight boxers
20th-century Norwegian people